The 1999–2000 season was Manchester United's eighth season in the Premier League, and their 25th consecutive season in the top division of English football. United won the Premier League title for the sixth time in eight seasons (with a record 18-point margin and 97 goals scored) as well as becoming the first English club to win the Intercontinental Cup when they defeated Palmeiras in Tokyo. However, they surrendered their Champions League title with a 3–2 defeat by eventual champions Real Madrid in the quarter-finals. The club controversially did not defend their FA Cup crown, upon request by The Football Association, to compete in the inaugural FIFA Club World Championship in Brazil instead.

Mark Bosnich, previously at United as a reserve goalkeeper from 1989 to 1991, returned to the club as Peter Schmeichel's successor, but failed to live up to expectations and in September, the club swooped for Italian Massimo Taibi to provide competition for him. However, Taibi suffered some high-profile mistakes and returned to his homeland at the end of the season after just four games for the club. As the season wore on, long-time reserve goalkeeper Raimond van der Gouw was increasingly called on as the starting goalkeeper, and proved a fairly reliable performer, but at 37 years old as of the end of the season, it was clear that he would not be a long-term solution. United then solved the goalkeeping crisis by paying AS Monaco £7.8 million for Fabien Barthez. Also new to the squad for 1999–2000 were French defender Mikaël Silvestre and South African winger Quinton Fortune. Jesper Blomqvist and Wes Brown missed the entire season due to injury, while similar misfortune restricted defenders David May and Ronny Johnsen to three first-team appearances between them. Jordi Cruyff left the club on a free transfer to Deportivo Alavés at the end of the season, seeing out his four-year contract at a club where he had failed to claim a regular first-team place.

Pre-season and friendlies

FA Charity Shield

UEFA Super Cup

FA Premier League

League Cup

UEFA Champions League

Group stage

Second group stage

Knockout phase

Intercontinental Cup

FIFA Club World Championship

Group stage

Squad statistics

Transfers
No players left Manchester United in the 1999 summer transfer window.

On 21 August, South African midfielder Quinton Fortune signed from Atlético Madrid for a fee of £1.5 million. Also arriving were Italian goalkeeper Massimo Taibi and French defender Mikaël Silvestre. All three players had slightly different careers at United and all stayed at United for a different number of seasons: Fortune spent seven years at Old Trafford, and his career was mixed; Taibi turned out to be a major flop and left after just one season; Silvestre left in 2008 and had a successful career with United.

United's only winter departure was Norwegian Erik Nevland, who returned to homeland club Viking Stavanger after two seasons. Richard Wellens departed on 23 March to Blackpool for a nominal fee. John Curtis joined Blackburn Rovers on 31 May for a fee of £1.5 million, while Michael Twiss joined Port Vale on 30 June on a free transfer.

No players joined United in the winter transfer window, but on 21 May, French goalkeeper Fabien Barthez was acquired.

In

Out

References

Manchester United F.C. seasons
Manchester United
2000
00